Bernard Buzyniski (May 3, 1938 – September 11, 2008) was a professional American football linebacker in the American Football League. He attended the Holy Cross. He would play for the Buffalo Bills in 1960.

External links
Pro-Football reference

1938 births
2008 deaths
Players of American football from New York (state)
American football linebackers
Buffalo Bills players
People from Lockport, New York
American Football League players